William Maxwell Nixon (1911–1992) was an Australian rugby league player who played in the 1930s.

Playing career
Originally a rugby union player, Nixon changed to league and was graded in 1930. He played at the Eastern Suburbs Roosters for seven seasons between 1931–1938. 

Nixon won a premiership with Easts in 1935, when his side defeated South Sydney Rabbitohs 19–3 in the final. He also played in the Easts team that was defeated by Western Suburbs in 1934.

Nixon died on 7 June 1992, aged 81.

References

Sydney Roosters players
Australian rugby league players
Rugby league props
Rugby league second-rows
1911 births
1992 deaths